USS Liberator may refer to:

 was a 44-gun frigate built in 1826 and later renamed Hudson
 was an animal transport, launched 24 March 1918 and sold in 1933
 was a coastal minesweeper launched 6 September 1941 and placed out of service 3 May 1945

See also

Liberator (disambiguation)

United States Navy ship names